Leptostylus sagittatus is a species of beetle in the family Cerambycidae. It was described by Pierre Nicolas Camille Jacquelin du Val in 1875.

References

Leptostylus
Beetles described in 1875